Nebaj is an archaeological site of the pre-Columbian Maya civilization, located in the western Guatemala highlands near the Ixil village of Santa Maria Nebaj. What is now known as the Fenton Vase was excavated from this site. It is now held in the British Museum.

Villages
 

Xexocom

References

Maya sites in Guatemala
Archaeological sites in Guatemala